The following is a list of Boston College Eagles men's basketball head coaches. The Eagles have had 17 head coaches in their 89-season history.

Boston College's current head coach is Earl Grant. He was hired in March 2021, replacing Scott Spinelli, who served as interim head coach after the Eagles fired Jim Christian a month earlier.

References

Boston College

Boston College Eagles men's basketball coaches